Warkill is a 1968 American drama film written and directed by Ferde Grofé Jr. and starring George Montgomery, Tom Drake, Conrad Parham, Eddie Infante, Henry Duval and Joaquin Fajardo. It was released in May 1968, by Universal Pictures.

Plot

Cast 
George Montgomery as Col. John Hannegan
Tom Drake as Phil Sutton
Conrad Parham as Pedrini
Eddie Infante as Dr. Fernandez
Henry Duval as Willy
Joaquin Fajardo as Max
Paul Edwards Jr. as Mike Harris
Claude Wilson as U.S. Major
Bert La Fortesa as Dr. Namura
Bruno Punzalan as Maj. Hashiri
David Michael as Sgt. Johnson

Production
In 1966 Montgomery announced he would make two films with Ferde Goff, Warkill and Ride the Tiger. The film was meant to be the first of 12 movies from Balut Productions, all directed by Goff; others were meant to include The Day of the Wolves and Ride the Tiger, also with Montgomery.

References

External links 
 

1968 films
American drama films
1968 drama films
Universal Pictures films
Films directed by Ferde Grofé Jr.
1960s English-language films
1960s American films